The 1954 Rugby League World Cup Final was the conclusive game of the 1954 Rugby League World Cup tournament and was played between France and Great Britain on 13 November 1954 at the Parc des Princes in Paris, France.

Background

The 1954 Rugby League World Cup was the inaugural staging of the Rugby League World Cup. The tournament was held in France from 30 October, culminating in the final between France and Great Britain on 13 November.

France

Scores and results list France's points tally first.

Great Britain

Scores and results list Great Britain's points tally first.

Match details

The BBC broadcast the whole match live in the UK via the Television Continental Exchange – a rare novelty for the time. France opened the scoring with a penalty Puig-Aubert kick from 45 yards out and played well early in the match, leading early in the second half thanks to a brilliant try from Cantoni. However Great Britain did not waver, with credit for the win given to a starring role by centre Phil Jackson and the play of their forward pack, as well as the tough match France had played against Australia in Nantes two days earlier. Great Britain defeated France 16–12 and became the first team to lift the World Cup.

References

Rugby League World Cup finals
final
International sports competitions hosted by Paris